Tcaciuc is a surname. Notable people with the surname include:

Andrei Tcaciuc (born 1982), Moldavian footballer
Vasile Tcaciuc (died 1935), Romanian serial killer

See also
 Tcaci